Ashley "Ellyllon" Jurgemeyer (born July 30, 1984) is an American pianist, keyboardist and songwriter for the band  Orbs and was the former pianist of symphonic black metal bands Abigail Williams and  of Cradle of Filth.

Biography
Ashley Jurgemeyer was classically trained on piano since age six. She got her bachelor's degree in Music Composition and Theory from Arizona State University and then started her career as a founding member of the band Abigail Williams in 2005. Jurgemeyer left the band in 2009 after becoming the new keyboardist for Cradle of Filth, replacing Rosie Smith. She recorded two releases with Abigail Williams, which are In the Shadow of a Thousand Suns and Legend. Ellyllon is also a part of the supergroup Orbs along with Dan Briggs of Between the Buried and Me and Adam Fisher of Fear Before (Fear Before the March of Flames). She is also working on a solo classical piano album.

Abigail Williams
Jurgemeyer was the keyboardist for the Abigail Williams from 2005 to 2008. During that time, she recorded two albums with the band. In early 2007, the band split. They later decided to resume Abigail Williams that same year, with Plaguehammer returning to bass guitar, Zach Gibson and Bjorn Dannov rejoining, and also Kristen Randall (Winds of Plague) joining the band. After a tour in late 2007, Kristen Randall left the band and joined Winds of Plague, to which Jurgemeyer rejoined them. She toured with the band in Europe and the United Kingdom in summer 2008.

Orbs

Jurgemeyer along with Dan Briggs (Between the Buried and Me) and Adam Fisher (Fear Before the March of Flames) formed Orbs. The band released their debut album, Asleep Next to Science, on August 17, 2010.

History 
The band began in fall 2007 as an online project working across the United States in a similar fashion of The Postal Service. The band has a similar sound to the progressive rock of Between the Buried and Me and the later experimental sound of Fear Before the March of Flames.

According to their official site, the sound and lyrics represent space and nature.

Asleep Next to Science was released on August 17, 2010, on Equal Vision Records with a tour to accompany it.

Orbs released a single entitled "These People Are Animals" on October 20, 2014. A second album, Past Life Regression, was released on July 15, 2016.

Band members

Current members 
 Adam Fisher – vocals, guitar
 Dan Briggs – guitar, bass guitar
 Ashley Ellyllon – keyboards, vocals
 Chuck Johnson – bass guitar, vocals
 Matt Lynch - drums

Previous members 
 Clayton "Goose" Holyoak – drums

Discography 
 Asleep Next to Science (2010)
Past Life Regression (2016)

Asleep Next to Science
Asleep Next to Science is the debut studio album by American progressive rock band Orbs. It was released on August 17, 2010 through Equal Vision Records and was produced by Jamie King, known for producing Between the Buried and Me and Alesana.

Background 
Orbs entered the studio at The Basement recording studio in Winston-Salem, N.C. in February 2009. It was produced by Jamie King, who worked with Between the Buried and Me on Colors and The Great Misdirect. On April 4, 2010, the band released a free download of two songs from the album to fans who signed up to their mailing list.

The band describes the album as "the product of long-distance friendships linked through an appreciation for music, nature, and a mutual desire to defy common song structure."

A tour in support of the album began on August 19, 2010 in Greensboro, N.C.

Reception 
The Allmusic review by Ned Raggett awarded the album 3 stars stating "Asleep Next to Science, the group's first full release, is both a familiar enough supergroup-styled effort thanks to the bandmembers' various backgrounds in acts like Between the Buried and Me and Abigail Williams and a modern version of it given that their work grew out of Internet-based collaboration. The album almost resists criticism in a way, though, because it is exactly all that -- come in expecting theatrical compositions, metal-tinged and emo-tinged and more besides, and you'll get it down to the concluding piano flourishes on 'Sayer of the Law,' not to mention plenty of keyboard breaks throughout courtesy of Ashley Ellyllon. The descending break and coda to 'Something Beautiful' show that the quintet can hit the epically melancholy heights with the best of them, and if such moments aren't always constant throughout the album, they happen enough times to set a good tone. Adam Fisher's vocals are the make-or-break point throughout -- there's something sweetly, strangely inspirational about hearing his thin, almost dorky whine riding the arrangements on songs like 'A Man of Science,' and a few times he makes it work unexpectedly, much like Billy Corgan did with his own out-of-place singing. At other points it's more hair-pulling, however, though song titles like 'Megaloblastic Madness' and the two-part 'The Northwestern Bearitories' might cause more double takes in the end -- or the line 'Chupacabras on the wing' in 'People Will Read Again.' "

Track listing

Personnel 
Orbs
Adam Fisher – vocals, electronic programming
Dan Briggs – guitar, bass
Ashley Ellyllon – keyboards, piano
Clayton Holyoak – drums, percussion
Chuck Johnson - Additional vocals on "We the Animal" and "Lost at Sea"
Production
Produced by Jamie King
Audio mixing by Jamie King
Illustration by Ben Tuttle

Cradle of Filth 
Jurgemeyer joined Cradle of Filth in 2009 after Rosie Smith's departure from the band, Jurgemeyer then joined to play keyboards and do backing vocals for the group.

Discography

Abigail Williams 
Legend (2006) EP
In the Shadow of a Thousand Suns (2008)
Becoming (2012)

Orbs 
Asleep Next to Science (2010)
Past Life Regression (2016)

Cradle of Filth 
Darkly, Darkly, Venus Aversa (2010)

Carnifex 
Until I Feel Nothing (2011)

Ryann 
Girl Ep (2012)

References

External links

 Ashley Ellyllon Official Facebook
 Official MySpace
 Official Website

1984 births
American rock pianists
21st-century American women pianists
21st-century American pianists
American heavy metal keyboardists
American women heavy metal singers
Singers from Arizona
American rock songwriters
Living people
Cradle of Filth members
21st-century American keyboardists
21st-century American women singers
21st-century American singers